Apollo Beach Golf & Sea Club is a Robert Trent Jones-designed golf club in Apollo Beach, Florida, built in 1962. The course makes heavy use of the mangrove marshes and lagoons surrounding the course.

References

Golf clubs and courses in Florida
Golf clubs and courses designed by Robert Trent Jones